The arrondissement of Castres is an arrondissement of France in the Tarn department in the Occitanie region. Its INSEE code is 812 and its capital city is Castres. It has 151 communes. It is the southernmost arrondissement of the department.

Castres is known for its Rugby Team Le Castres Olympique (CO).

Geography
The arrondissement of Castres is bordered to the north by the arrondissement of Albi, to the northeast by the Aveyron department, to the east by the Hérault department, to the south by the Aude department and to the west by the Haute-Garonne department.

Composition

The communes of the arrondissement of Castres, and their INSEE codes, are:

 Aguts (81001)
 Aiguefonde (81002)
 Albine (81005)
 Algans (81006)
 Ambres (81011)
 Anglès (81014)
 Appelle (81015)
 Arfons (81016)
 Arifat (81017)
 Aussillon (81021)
 Bannières (81022)
 Barre (81023)
 Belcastel (81025)
 Belleserre (81027)
 Berlats (81028)
 Bertre (81030)
 Le Bez (81031)
 Blan (81032)
 Boissezon (81034)
 Bout-du-Pont-de-Larn (81036)
 Brassac (81037)
 Briatexte (81039)
 Brousse (81040)
 Burlats (81042)
 Busque (81043)
 Cabanès (81044)
 Cahuzac (81049)
 Cambon-lès-Lavaur (81050)
 Cambounès (81053)
 Cambounet-sur-le-Sor (81054)
 Les Cammazes (81055)
 Carbes (81058)
 Castres (81065)
 Caucalières (81066)
 Cuq (81075)
 Cuq-Toulza (81076)
 Damiatte (81078)
 Dourgne (81081)
 Durfort (81083)
 Escoussens (81084)
 Escroux (81085)
 Espérausses (81086)
 Fiac (81092)
 Fontrieu (81062)
 Fréjeville (81098)
 Garrevaques (81100)
 Garrigues (81102)
 Gijounet (81103)
 Giroussens (81104)
 Graulhet (81105)
 Guitalens-L'Albarède (81132)
 Jonquières (81109)
 Labastide-Rouairoux (81115)
 Labastide-Saint-Georges (81116)
 Laboulbène (81118)
 Labruguière (81120)
 Lacabarède (81121)
 Lacaune (81124)
 Lacaze (81125)
 Lacougotte-Cadoul (81126)
 Lacroisille (81127)
 Lacrouzette (81128)
 Lagardiolle (81129)
 Lagarrigue (81130)
 Lamontélarié (81134)
 Lasfaillades (81137)
 Lautrec (81139)
 Lavaur (81140)
 Lempaut (81142)
 Lescout (81143)
 Lugan (81150)
 Magrin (81151)
 Marzens (81157)
 Le Masnau-Massuguiès (81158)
 Massac-Séran (81159)
 Massaguel (81160)
 Maurens-Scopont (81162)
 Mazamet (81163)
 Missècle (81169)
 Montcabrier (81173)
 Montdragon (81174)
 Montfa (81177)
 Montgey (81179)
 Montpinier (81181)
 Montredon-Labessonnié (81182)
 Mont-Roc (81183)
 Moulayrès (81187)
 Moulin-Mage (81188)
 Mouzens (81189)
 Murat-sur-Vèbre (81192)
 Nages (81193)
 Navès (81195)
 Noailhac (81196)
 Palleville (81200)
 Payrin-Augmontel (81204)
 Péchaudier (81205)
 Peyregoux (81207)
 Pont-de-Larn (81209)
 Poudis (81210)
 Prades (81212)
 Pratviel (81213)
 Puéchoursi (81214)
 Puybegon (81215)
 Puycalvel (81216)
 Puylaurens (81219)
 Rayssac (81221)
 Le Rialet (81223)
 Roquecourbe (81227)
 Roquevidal (81229)
 Rouairoux (81231)
 Saint-Affrique-les-Montagnes (81235)
 Saint-Agnan (81236)
 Saint-Amancet (81237)
 Saint-Amans-Soult (81238)
 Saint-Amans-Valtoret (81239)
 Saint-Avit (81242)
 Saint-Gauzens (81248)
 Saint-Genest-de-Contest (81250)
 Saint-Germain-des-Prés (81251)
 Saint-Germier (81252)
 Saint-Jean-de-Rives (81255)
 Saint-Jean-de-Vals (81256)
 Saint-Julien-du-Puy (81258)
 Saint-Lieux-lès-Lavaur (81261)
 Saint-Paul-Cap-de-Joux (81266)
 Saint-Pierre-de-Trivisy (81267)
 Saint-Salvi-de-Carcavès (81268)
 Saint-Salvy-de-la-Balme (81269)
 Saint-Sernin-lès-Lavaur (81270)
 Saint-Sulpice-la-Pointe (81271)
 Saïx (81273)
 Sauveterre (81278)
 Sémalens (81281)
 Senaux (81282)
 Serviès (81286)
 Sorèze (81288)
 Soual (81289)
 Teulat (81298)
 Teyssode (81299)
 Vabre (81305)
 Valdurenque (81307)
 Veilhes (81310)
 Vénès (81311)
 Verdalle (81312)
 Viane (81314)
 Vielmur-sur-Agout (81315)
 Villeneuve-lès-Lavaur (81318)
 Le Vintrou (81321)
 Viterbe (81323)
 Viviers-lès-Lavaur (81324)
 Viviers-lès-Montagnes (81325)

History

The arrondissement of Castres was created in 1800.

As a result of the reorganisation of the cantons of France which came into effect in 2015, the borders of the cantons are no longer related to the borders of the arrondissements. The cantons of the arrondissement of Castres were, as of January 2015:

 Anglès
 Brassac
 Castres-Est
 Castres-Nord
 Castres-Ouest
 Castres-Sud
 Cuq-Toulza
 Dourgne
 Graulhet
 Labruguière
 Lacaune
 Lautrec
 Lavaur
 Mazamet-Nord-Est
 Mazamet-Sud-Ouest
 Montredon-Labessonnié
 Murat-sur-Vèbre
 Puylaurens
 Roquecourbe
 Saint-Amans-Soult
 Saint-Paul-Cap-de-Joux
 Vabre
 Vielmur-sur-Agout

References

Castres